Curse of the Coffin is the second album by the Danish psychobilly band the Nekromantix, released in 1991 by Nervous Records. A music video was filmed for the title track and received some play on the MTV program Alternative Nation. The album's final track is a loose cover of "Mama Don't Allow It," a piano tune from the 1920s and 1930s by Cow Cow Davenport, with new lyrics written by band frontman Kim Nekroman.

Track listing
All songs written by Gaarde/Sandorff except where indicated

Performers
Kim Nekroman - double bass, vocals
Peter Sandorff - guitar, backing vocals
Peek - drums

Album information
Record label: Nervous Records
All songs written by Gaarde/Sandorff except "Mama Don't Allow" by Cow Cow Davenport.
Recorded at Madhouse Studio in Luton, England
Engineered by Pete Gage
Produced by Mickey Mutant

References

Nekromantix albums
1991 albums